Quinn Brian Sypniewski [sip-New-ski] (born April 14, 1982) is a former American football tight end. He was drafted by the Baltimore Ravens in the fifth round of the 2006 NFL Draft. He is a graduate of Johnston, Iowa High School and played college football at Colorado.

College career
Sypniewski played college football at Colorado. He appeared in 55 games a school career record. He graduated in May 2005 with dual degrees in journalism and history.

Professional career
He was signed to a three-year contract after being drafted by the Ravens in the fifth round (166th overall) in the 2006 NFL Draft. In his rookie season, Sypniewski saw action in all 16 games, primarily as a blocker. He finished the year with two catches for 15 yards.

Due to injuries to Todd Heap and Daniel Wilcox, Sypniewski saw more action early in the 2007 season, with six receptions against the Cleveland Browns on September 30, and more against San Francisco on October 7. He finished the season with 34 receptions for 246 yards and one touchdown.

On April 19, 2008, Sypniewski tore his ACL and suffered minor damage to other ligaments during an offseason workout. The injury occurred when he bumped into teammate Antwan Barnes, causing him to plant his leg awkwardly on the floor. He was placed on season-ending injured reserve on July 18.

Sypniewski was waived on February 17, 2010 after failing to pass a physical.

Personal life
Sypniewski is married the former Mia Whiting in July 2006. The couple has a daughter, Keira, and a son, Kolt.
Sypniewski’s father, George Sypniewski died on January 29, 2019, after a two and a half month battle with Acute Myeloid Leukemia, with his family by his side

References

1982 births
Living people
American football tight ends
Baltimore Ravens players
Colorado Buffaloes football players
Players of American football from Iowa
People from Granger, Iowa
People from Johnston, Iowa